Pichigua District is one of eight districts of the Espinar Province in Peru.

Geography 
Other mountains are listed below:

Ethnic groups 
The people in the district are mainly indigenous citizens of Quechua descent. Quechua is the language which the majority of the population (87.16%) learnt to speak in childhood, 12.40% of the residents started speaking using the Spanish language (2007 Peru Census).

References